The Tucson Extreme were an American professional indoor soccer team founded in 2012 with the intention of joining the Professional Arena Soccer League.

The Tucson Extreme was originally scheduled to begin play as a Southwestern Division team in the 2012–13 PASL season with home games at the Tucson Convention Center and Randy Soderman as head coach. They scheduled tryouts and advertised ticket sales but, in September 2012, delayed their launch by one year. The Extreme were then scheduled to play starting in the 2013–14 season but disbanded in early 2013.

References

External links
Tucson Extreme official website
Professional Arena Soccer League website

Defunct Professional Arena Soccer League teams
Indoor soccer clubs in the United States
2012 establishments in Arizona
Association football clubs established in 2012
2013 disestablishments in Arizona
Association football clubs disestablished in 2013
Sports in Tucson, Arizona